The office of Commander-in-Chief, North America was a military position of the British Army.  Established in 1755 in the early years of the Seven Years' War, holders of the post were generally responsible for land-based military personnel and activities in and around those parts of North America that Great Britain either controlled or contested.  The post continued to exist until 1775, when Lieutenant-General Thomas Gage, the last holder of the post, was replaced early in the American War of Independence. The post's responsibilities were then divided: Major-General William Howe became Commander-in-Chief, America, responsible for British troops from West Florida to Newfoundland, and General Guy Carleton became Commander-in-Chief, Quebec, responsible for the defence of the Province of Quebec.

This division of responsibility persisted after American independence and the loss of East and West Florida in the Treaty of Paris (1783).  One officer was given the posting for Quebec, which later became the Commander-in-Chief of The Canadas when Quebec was divided into Upper and Lower Canada, while another officer was posted to Halifax with responsibility for military matters in the maritime provinces.

Prior to 1784, the Bermuda Garrison (an independent company, detached from the 2nd Regiment of Foot, from 1701 to 1763; replaced by a company of the 9th Regiment of Foot detached from Florida along with a detachment from the Bahamas Independent Company until 1768; leaving only the militia until the American War of Independence, when part of the Royal Garrison Battalion had been stationed in Bermuda between 1778 and its disbandment there in 1784; the garrison was permanently re-established by the 47th Regiment of Foot and an invalid company of the Royal Artillery during the French Revolution, along with the establishment of what was to become the Royal Naval Dockyard, Bermuda) had been placed under the military Commander-in-Chief America, but was subsequently to become part of the Nova Scotia Command until the 1860s.

During the American War of 1812, Lieutenant-General Sir George Prevost was Captain-General and Governor-in-Chief in and over the Provinces of Upper-Canada, Lower-Canada, Nova-Scotia, and New~Brunswick, and their several Dependencies, Vice-Admiral of the same, Lieutenant-General and Commander of all His Majesty’s Forces in the said Provinces of Lower Canada and Upper-Canada, Nova-Scotia and New-Brunswick, and their several Dependencies, and in the islands of Newfoundland, Prince Edward, Cape Breton and the Bermudas, &c. &c. &c.

Beneath Prevost, the staff of the British Army in the Provinces of Nova-Scotia, New-Brunswick, and their Dependencies, including the Islands of Newfoundland, Cape Breton, Prince Edward and Bermuda were under the Command of Lieutenant-General Sir John Coape Sherbrooke. Below Sherbrooke, the Bermuda Garrison was under the immediate control of the Governor of Bermuda, Major-General George Horsford), New Bruswick was under Major-General George Stracey Smyth, Newfoundland was under Major-General Charles Campbell, and Cape Breton was under Major-General Hugh Swayne.

Following Canadian Confederation in 1867, these commanders were replaced in 1875 by the General Officer Commanding the Forces (Canada), whose post was succeeded in 1904 by the Chief of the General Staff Canada, a position which was established for a Canadian Army commander.

Commanders-in-Chief, North America 1755–1775

Commanders-in-Chief, America 1775–1783

Commanders-in-Chief, Quebec 1775–1791

Commanders-in-Chief of The Canadas 1791–1864

Commanders-in-Chief, Maritime provinces 1783–1875

See also 
North America and West Indies Station
Commander-in-Chief, North American Station

Notes

References

Military history of the Thirteen Colonies
Military history of Quebec
Senior appointments of the British Army
Military personnel of the British Empire